Pivetti is a family name of Italian origin. It may refer to: 

 Irene Pivetti, Italian journalist and former PResident of House of Representatives
 Loris Pivetti (1908-1941), Italian aircraft pilot and captain of the Regia Aeronautica, Silver Medal of Military Valor
 Veronica Pivetti, Italian actress and voice actress
 
Italian-language surnames

it:Pivetti